The 1998 Winnipeg Blue Bombers finished in 4th place in the East Division with a 3–15 record and failed to make the playoffs.

Offseason

CFL Draft

Regular season

Season standings

Season schedule

Awards and records
CFLPA's Most Outstanding Community Service Award – Glen Scrivener (DT)

1998 CFL All-Stars
ST – Eric Blount, CFL All-Star
DT – Joe Fleming, CFL All-Star

Eastern All-Star Selections
OT – Chris Perez, CFL Eastern All-Star
ST – Eric Blount, CFL Eastern All-Star
DT – Joe Fleming, CFL Eastern All-Star
DT – Doug Petersen, CFL Eastern All-Star
LB – Grant Carter, CFL Eastern All-Star

References

Winnipeg Blue Bombers seasons
Winn
Winnipeg Blue Bombers